Whitcoulls is a major New Zealand book, stationery, gift, games & toy retail chain. Formerly known as Whitcombe & Tombs, it has 54 stores nationally. Whitcombe & Tombs was founded in 1888, and Coulls Somerville Wilkie in 1871. The companies merged in 1971 to form Whitcoulls.

Coulls Somerville Wilkie 
Coulls Somerville Wilkie had its origins in Coull Bros, founded in Dunedin in 1872 by brothers Thomas, William, and James Francis Coull. A printing and publishing company, it operated from Crawford Street to the south of the city centre.. Through merger and partnership, its name changed several times before becoming Coulls, Culling & Co. Ltd., a name under which it traded from 1902 until 1922.<ref name="Hocken">"Business series 2a: Manufacturing," Friends of the Hocken Bulletin 53, April 2006. Retrieved 20 July 2013.</ref> The Culling in the company's name was Thomas Culling, regarded as the 'father of printing in Otago', whose business work extended to the founding of several newspapers, notably the Otago Witness.

In 1922, Coulls, Culling & Co. merged with J. Wilkie & Co., becoming Coulls Somerville Wilkie, a name under which it operated until 1971. J. Wilkie was founded in the early 1870s by James Wilkie, and bought by William George Somerville in 1894. Originally a stationer and bookseller, J. Wilkie & Co. operated from Princes Street until its amalgamation with Coulls, Culling & Co. in 1921.

 Whitcombe & Tombs 
Whitcombe & Tombs began in 1882 in Cashel Street, Christchurch, as a partnership between a teacher of French who had become a bookseller, George Hawkes Whitcombe and printer George Tombs.

In 1883 the company was among the first registered under the Companies Act 1882. It had market dominance for several decades. George Whitcombe's son, Bertie Ernest Hawkes Whitcombe (1875–1963), was associated with the business for over 70 years.

Thousands of schoolchildren were taught with the aid of Whitcombe's Progressive Primers and later enjoyed Whitcombe's Story Books such as The Adventures of Hoppity Bobtail.

The company, in common with most companies, did not have a completely trouble-free relationship with employees. A court judgment Whitcombe & Tombs Limited v Taylor (1907) 27 NZLR 237 stated the principle that "a well established custom or practice may become part of a contract" (as noted by the Court of Appeal of New Zealand in CA246/03, nearly a century later, despite half a dozen intervening changes of employment law).

 History (1971-now) 
In 1971, Whitcombe & Tombs merged with Coulls Somerville Wilkie to become Whitcoulls, and has since been sold several times. It now operates as a retail chain only.

The limited company itself described here has changed its name to reflect the changes in ownership. It became the holding company Printing and Packaging Corporation Limited at the time of the merger. It became Whitcoulls Group Limited in 1982, WGL Group Limited in 1993 and has been known as WGL Retail Holdings Limited since 1995. It is still on the companies register as company number 120265. Its current ultimate parent that can be traced appears to be Whitcoulls Finance in Australia, ACN 109 241 394. 

In 2001 U.K retailer W H Smith purchased the company. 

In 2004 Whitcoulls was sold to REDgroup a retail operations company owned by Pacific Equity Partners, a subsidiary of UK-based insurance company Prudential. 

On 17 February 2011, RedGroup Retail (including the Borders, Angus & Robertson as well as Whitcoulls chains) were placed into voluntary administration with Ferrier Hodgson appointed as administrators. 

On 26 May 2011 it was announced that the company had been sold to Project Mark Ltd, part of the James Pascoe Group owned by the Norman family who have a history of turning around troubled companies such as the Farmers department store.

Despite operating in the retail sector, in the years 1958-2013 there was a small publishing program based in Christchurch under the Whitcoulls imprint.

As of 2022 Whitcoulls is trading as a major retailer with more than 50 stores across New Zealand which offer "books, stationery, toys, puzzles, games, gifts, greeting cards and wrap, and magazines".

References

Further reading
 Ian F. McLaren and G.J. Griffiths, Whitcombe's Story Books: A Descriptive List, 1981.
 Ian F. McLaren with George J. Griffiths, Whitcombe's Story Books: A Trans-Tasman Survey, Parkville : University of Melbourne Library, 1984. 
 Ian F. McLaren, Whitcombe's Story Books: A Trans-Tasman Survey: First Supplement'', Parkville: University of Melbourne Library, 1987.

External links

A & R Whitcoulls Group Holdings
Potted biography of the founder's son Bertie Whitcombe
Harry Tombs, OBE
 Book Barons – the Whitcombe & Tombs Story (Lost Christchurch website)

Bookshops of New Zealand
Book publishing companies of New Zealand
Office supply companies of New Zealand
Retail companies established in 1971
New Zealand companies established in 1971